"(You've Got) The Magic Touch" is a song written by Buck Ram, and performed by The Platters. It reached #4 on both the U.S. pop chart and the U.S. R&B chart in 1956.

The song was ranked #36 on Billboard magazine's Top 50 singles of 1956.

Other versions
The song was sampled in the 1956 novelty song "The Flying Saucer" by Bill Buchanan and Dickie Goodman.
Buck Ram and His Orchestra released a version on their 1959 EP The Magic Touch.
Billy Walker released a version as a single in 1977, but it did not chart.

References

1956 songs
1956 singles
1977 singles
The Platters songs
Billy Walker (musician) songs
Mercury Records singles
Songs written by Buck Ram
Song recordings produced by Ray Pennington